Mikkel Konradsen Ceïde (born 3 September 2001) is a Norwegian footballer who plays for Norwegian club Kristiansund on loan from Rosenborg.

Club career

Mikkel signed for Rosenborg from Finnsnes in May 2017 along with his brother Emil.

On 25 July 2021, he made his debut for Rosenborg when he came on against Melhus in a Cup game which Rosenborg won 7-0. He played alongside his brother Emil and as a result became the first twins to ever play an official match for Rosenborg. A few days later he came on and played against Icelandic FH in the Europa Conference League second qualifying round.

On 22 August, Mikkel made his league debut in a 5-0 win over Odd coming on as a substitute. Four days later he signed a new contract and was sent out on loan to Ranheim.

On 21 March 2022, Konradsen Ceïde moved on a new loan to Utsikten in the Swedish second-tier Superettan. He returned from loan in August and went out on a new loan to Tromsø.

In 2023, Konradsen Ceïde was sent out on season long loan to Kristiansund.

Career statistics

Club

Personal life
Mikkel's father is Haitian while his mother is Norwegian. He has a twin brother named Emil who also plays for Rosenborg. They are second cousins with fellow Rosenborg player Anders Konradsen and Bodø/Glimt player Morten Konradsen.

References

External links
 

2001 births
People from Senja
Norwegian people of Haitian descent
Living people
Norwegian footballers
Association football forwards
Rosenborg BK players
Ranheim Fotball players
Utsiktens BK players
Norwegian Second Division players
Eliteserien players
Norwegian First Division players
Superettan players
Norwegian expatriate footballers
Expatriate footballers in Sweden
Norwegian expatriate sportspeople in Sweden
Sportspeople from Troms og Finnmark